Elkin is both a surname and a given name. Notable people with the name include:

Surname:
A. P. Elkin (1891–1979), Australian anthropologist
Carrie Elkin (born 1974), singer and musician
John P. Elkin (1860–1915), Pennsylvania Attorney General, Supreme Court justice
Saul Elkin, actor
Stanley Elkin (1930–1995), novelist
Stanley Edward Elkin (1880–1960), businessman
William Lewis Elkin (1855–1933), astronomer
Zac Elkin (born 1991), South African cricketer
Ze'ev Elkin (born 1971), politician

Given name:
Elkin Barrera (born 1971), cyclist
Elkin Blanco (born 1989), footballer
Elkin Murillo (born 1977), footballer
Elkin Serna, Paralympian
Elkin Soto (born 1980), footballer

See also
Charles Elkin Mathews (1851–1921), bookseller
Manuel Elkin Patarroyo (born 1946), pathologist